Shirley Herz (December 30, 1925 – August 11, 2013) was an American Broadway theatre production press representative.

Herz had publicized Broadway, Off-Broadway and Off-Off Broadway productions, ballet companies, circuses, worlds fairs, films and television programs, beginning in 1954, aged 28, when she was the press assistant for the Truman Capote and Harold Arlen musical, House of Flowers. She worked with many notables, including Tallulah Bankhead, Rosalind Russell, Eva Le Gallienne, Jerry Herman, and Julie Harris, as well as with many off-Broadway (such as Manhattan Theatre Club) and off-off-Broadway companies.

The Broadway League and the American Theatre Wing presented Herz with a special Tony Award for Excellence in Theatre at the 63rd Tony Awards ceremony on June 7, 2009.

Death
Herz suffered a stroke on July 18, 2013 and died on August 11, aged 87. Her sole immediate survivor is her widower, Herbert Boley, to whom she was married from 1948 until her death.

Productions
Broadway productions for which she acted as press agent or representative include:

Who's Afraid of Virginia Woolf?, 2005The Goat, or Who is Sylvia?  2002Angela Lansbury - A Celebration, 1996Translations, 1995The Rise and Fall of Little Voice, 1994A Little More Magic, 1994Wonderful Tennessee, 1993Mixed Emotions, 1993Someone Who'll Watch Over Me, 1992-1993Crazy He Calls Me, 1992Catskills on Broadway, 1991-93Park Your Car in Harvard Yard, 1991-92Peter Pan, 1990–91; 1991-92Shogun, The Musical, 1990-91Fiddler on the Roof [Revival], 1990-91 A Change in the Heir, 1990Cat on a Hot Tin Roof  [Revival]  1990 Gypsy [Revival], 1989-91Prince of Central Park, 1989 The Threepenny Opera [Revival], 1989Dangerous Games, 1989 Starmites, 1989Chu Chem, 1989Cafe Crown [Revival], 1989Legs Diamond  1988-89Paul Robeson [Revival]  1988Burn This, 1988  All My Sons, 1987Raggedy Ann, 1986Jerry's Girls, 1986 Singin' in the Rain, 1985-86Home Front, 1985Quilters, 1984 Open Admissions, 1984Marilyn, 1983La Cage aux Folles, 1983-87The Ritz  [Revival]  1983Ned & Jack, 1981Wally's Cafe, 1981The Five O'Clock Girl [Revival], 1981 To Grandmother's House We Go, 1981Onward Victoria, 1980Perfectly Frank, 1980 Happy New Year, 1980Canterbury Tales [Revival], 1980The Lady from Dubuque, 1980King of Schnorrers, 1979-80Strider, 1979-80The Madwoman of Central Park West, 1979 My Old Friends, 1979Platinum, 1978 The November People, 1978An Almost Perfect Person, 1977-78The Night of the Tribades, 1977The Royal Family (play) [Revival], 1976Summer Brave, 1975Ride the Winds, 1974Holiday [Revival], 1973-74Chemin de Fer [Revival], 1973-74The Visit [Revival], 1973-74The Women [Revival], 1973Look Away, 1973 Ring Around the Bathtub, 1972 Hedda Gabler [Revival], 1971A Doll's House [Revival], 1971 The Rothschilds, 1970-72 Oh! Calcutta!, 1969-72 Forty Carats, 1968-70The Family Way, 1965Zizi, 1964-65  Conversation at Midnight, 1964A Girl Could Get Lucky, 1964 Marathon '33, 1963-64Romulus, 1962Everybody Loves Opal, 1961 Mary, Mary, 1961-64Happy Town, 1959The Cold Wind and the Warm, 1958-59Miss Isobel, 1957-58Rumple, 1957Compulsion, 1957-58The Cave Dwellers, 1957-58Romanoff and Juliet, 1957-58House of Flowers, 1954–55.

References

External links
Shirley Herz papers, 1959-1984, held by the Billy Rose Theatre Division, New York Public Library for the Performing Arts

1925 births
2013 deaths
American public relations people
Broadway press agents
People from Philadelphia